In Australia, a Union Church is a church building owned and maintained by a local trust and available to multiple denominations.

Such churches were once common in rural areas. Some were available to all denominations and even to other religions, others specified particular beliefs, such as the Nicene Creed. Many still exist and are in regular use.

Existing Union Churches

New South Wales

Araluen Union Church 
There is a Union Church at Araluen. It was built, in 1911, on land donated by William Mundy, on the condition that the building could be used by any denomination. It is used currently for Anglican and Uniting services on alternating weeks.

Caloola Union Church
In Caloola, New South Wales, this is still maintained by a Trust, and has a historic cemetery. It opened and was dedicated in 1865.

As of 2021, four interdenominational Sunday services are conducted each year, with clergy from several denominations attending each.

Meroo Union Church

Mangrove Mountain Union Church

Moonan Flat Union Church 
The Union Church in the village of Moonan Flat, in the Upper Hunter Valley, New South Wales, is used for Anglican and Uniting Church services.

Neurea Union Church 
The small Union Church at  the locality of Neurea, south of Wellington, is currently in recess, but not officially closed.

Queensland 
In Queensland, union churches are often titled using words such as "non-denominational", "undenominational", "united" and "community".
Caboonbah Undenominational Church
Purga United Church
United Welsh Church, Blackstone
 Community church, Mount Mee
 Hemmant Christian Community Church
 Ravenswood Community Church

Historic Union Churches

New South Wales

Awaba Union Church 
There is a small disused Union Church building at Awaba, New South Wales.

Beckom Union Church 
There is a disused Union Church building in the village of Beckom.

Brocklesby Union Church 
The building that was formerly the Union Church, at Brocklesby is now privately owned.

Burraga Union Church 
There was a Union Church at Burraga.

Cooks Myalls Union Church 
There is a Union Church at the locality Cooks Myalls, north-west of Parkes, It is probably disused.

Craven Union Church 
The building that was formerly the Union Church, at the locality of Craven, south of Gloucester, is now privately owned.

Girilambone Union Church 
A Union Church was opened at Girilambone, New South Wales, in January 1913. It was in use until at least the mid 1930s.

Glen Alice Union Church 
There is a Union Church building at the small settlement of Glen Alice. Its status is uncertain, but it was in use in 2014.

Glen Innes Union Church 
The building that was formerly the Union Church at Glen Innes is now privately owned.

Gulgong Union Church 
The first church in Gulgong, New South Wales was a Union Church, built around 1870. It was a pole and bark building that stood in Medley Street, probably opposite where the Memorial Hall stands today. After the various denominations built their own churches, the building was used, for a time, as the town's Catholic school.

Larbert Union Church 
There was a Union Church building at Larbert, New South Wales, from around 1878 to some time in the 1970s. All that remains are its steps, foundations and the adjoining cemetery.

Marrangaroo Union Church 
The heritage-listed stone building at Marrangaroo, was once a Union Church. It was opened in 1897, by Joseph Cook. Half the iron for the roof was donated by Lithgow ironmaster, William Sandford. Title was ceded to the Anglican Church, in 1972, and it continued to use the building until around 1980. In 1983 the building was used as a library block for the Gateway Christian School. It reopened as a church, 'Marrangaroo Prayer Chapel', from 1989 to 1997. It is now privately owned.

St John's Union Church, Running Stream 
There is a now disused Union Church, with a small cemetery, at the locality of Running Stream, off the Castlereagh Highway to the south of Ilford, New South Wales. It opened in 1906, although it seems that the associated cemetery predates the church building.

Turill Union Church 
The building that was formerly the Union Church at the locality of Turill, south-west of Cassilis, is now privately owned.

South Australia

Renmark West Union Church 
Made from the union of the Presbyterian, Methodist and Congregational Churches. The Church began operating in June 1918 in the Renmark West School with Rev. E. W. Sanders (Methodist) and Rev. A. E. Francis (Congregational) and built their own Church on donated land, starting on November 6, 1919 and opened on October 31st, 1920. 
The Church continues operating today under the Uniting Church of Australia and celebrated its Centenary in November 2019. Services are conducted by the Renmark/Loxton resident Minister every Sunday at 8:30am.

References

Union churches in Australia